Capnophyllum is a genus of flowering plant in the Apiaceae. It contains four species. They are endemic to southern Africa, particularly near the Cape of Good Hope.

Species

References 

Apioideae
Apioideae genera